The Estadio Balear is a football stadium located in Palma, Balearic Islands, Spain. 
Closed between 2013 and 2019 on safety grounds, it is the home stadium of the CD Atlético Baleares football team. There is a covered stand with 4,200 seats, and the pitch's dimensions are 102×67 metres.

History
Estadio Balear opened on 8 May 1960, with a 2–0 friendly win against Birmingham City.

On 14 June 2013, the stadium was closed by Palma city council due to a risk of collapse. Four years and a half later, on 14 December 2017, the renovation works started and the capacity of the stadium would be reduced to about 4,200.

During the stadium's closure, CD Atlético Baleares have played home games at the  nearby.

The renovation of the stadium was scheduled to finish in August 2019.

References

External links 
Atlético Baleares official site 
Estadios de Espana 

Football venues in the Balearic Islands
CD Atlético Baleares
Sports venues completed in 1960
Buildings and structures in Palma de Mallorca